{{DISPLAYTITLE:Omicron1 Orionis}}

Omicron1 Orionis (ο1 Ori) is a binary star in the northeastern corner of the constellation Orion. It is visible to the naked eye with an apparent visual magnitude of 4.7. At that distance, the visual magnitude of the star is diminished by an interstellar absorption factor of 0.27 due to intervening dust.

The two components of this system have an orbital period of greater than 1,900 days (5.2 years). The primary component is an evolved red giant with the stellar classification of M3S III. This is an S-type star on the asymptotic giant branch. It is a semiregular variable that is pulsating with periods of 30.8 and 70.7 days, each with nearly identical amplitudes of 0.05 in magnitude. The star has an estimated 90% of the mass of the Sun but has expanded to 214 times the Sun's radius. It shines with 4,046 times the solar luminosity from its outer atmosphere at an effective temperature of 3,465 K.

References

M-type giants
S-type stars
Asymptotic-giant-branch stars
Orion (constellation)
Orionis, Omicron1
Orionis, 04
030959
022667
1556
Semiregular variable stars
Binary stars
Durchmusterung objects